Burma Rani is a 1945 Indian Tamil-language war-spy film directed by T. R. Sundaram. It starred K. L. V. Vasantha in the lead role of the female spy Mangalam and Sundaram, himself, as the lead antagonist. The film was believed to be lost until 2006, when it was rediscovered and made available on DVD.

Pre-production 

At the height of World War II in 1943, the government of British India brought forth a rule that out of three Indian films made, two should be in support of the British war effort. Burma Rani was one of such movies produced by Modern Theatres and directed by T. R. Sundaram.

Cast 

Male cast
 C. Honnappa Bhagavathar as Kumar
 Serukalathur Sama as Buddhist Monk
 K. K. Perumal as Uso
 T. S. Balaiah as Ranjith Singh
 S. V. Sahasranamam as Kundu Rao
 A. Dhasaratha Rao as Soni
 S. R. Sandow as Gotto
 N. S. Krishnan as Kunjitham
 Kali N. Rathnam as Koduchi
 V. M. Ezhumalai as Umpan
 M. E. Madhavan as Madhav

Female cast
 K. L. V. Vasantha as Rani
 T. A. Mathuram as Banama
 C. T. Rajakantham as Miss Mangalam
 Matha, Mary as Burmese Girl

References 

1945 films
1940s Tamil-language films
Indian black-and-white films
Indian war films
Indian spy films
Films directed by T. R. Sundaram
World War II spy films
Films scored by K. V. Mahadevan
1940s rediscovered films
1940s war films
Rediscovered Indian films
Films set in Myanmar
Burma Campaign films